Cleere is a surname. Notable people with the name include:

 Nigel Cleere (born 1955), English ornithologist
 Peter Cleere (born 1982), Irish hurler 
 Séamus Cleere (born 1940), Irish hurler

See also
 Clear (disambiguation)
 Cleare, a surname
 Clere, a surname
 St Cleer, village in Cornwall, England